Live at Madison Square Garden is the first live album by Canadian singer and songwriter Shawn Mendes. The album features the hit singles "Mercy", "Treat You Better", Stitches" and "Life of the Party" alongside special medleys of other songs. The album was released worldwide, digitally on December 19, 2016.

Background and release 
On 10 September 2016, Mendes recorded his one-night-only Madison Square Garden show which was a part of his Shawn Mendes World Tour which took place across North America and Europe throughout 2016. The album serves to document the singer-songwriter's first-time ever headlining the historic New York City venue. The album was announced on 19 December 2016 and released 4 days later.

Following the performance Mendes' second album, Illuminate, debuted at No. 1 on the Billboard 200 chart in September. He headlined Radio City Music Hall and performed on Saturday Night Live in December 2016.

Critical reception

Stephen Thomas Erlewine from AllMusic said; "Live at Madison Square Garden is a digital-only document of Shawn Mendes' September 10, 2016 concert in New York City... The crowd was primed for Mendes, who delivered earnest renditions of his hits, a couple of medleys, and teasers from the new record (Illuminate). If the record isn't especially kinetic, it's nevertheless sincere and Mendes relies on the same increasing sense of craft that made his second record stronger than his debut, which helps make this a nice little souvenir for fans."

Track listing

Charts

Release history

References 

2016 live albums
Shawn Mendes albums
Island Records live albums
Universal Records live albums
Albums recorded at Madison Square Garden